Claudine Le Roux (born 22 November 1964 in Hennebont, Brittany, France) is a French sprint canoer who competed in the late 1980s. She was eliminated in the semifinals of the K-4 500 m event at the 1988 Summer Olympics in Seoul.

References
 Sports-reference.com profile

1964 births
Living people
People from Hennebont
French female canoeists
Canoeists at the 1988 Summer Olympics
Olympic canoeists of France
Sportspeople from Morbihan